PT Hyundai Motor Manufacturing Indonesia (HMMI) is an automobile manufacturing plant located in Cikarang, Bekasi Regency, Indonesia. The plant and a separate sales company, PT Hyundai Motors Indonesia (HMID) are wholly owned subsidiaries of Hyundai Motor Company.

It replaced the role of Hyundai Indonesia Motor (renamed to Handal Indonesia Motor since November 2020), a locally-owned company which held rights to assemble Hyundai cars in Indonesia since 1996, while HMID replaced the role of Hyundai Mobil Indonesia (HMI), the locally owned distributor of Hyundai cars in Indonesia from 1999 to 2021.

The plant is built in a 77.6 ha land in Cikarang and has been operated since the second half of 2021 with the annual capacity of 150,000. Half of the output will be exported to the neighbouring countries in Southeast Asia. A total of US$1.55 billion (Rp 21.7 trillion) will be invested to the plant along with the future product developments until 2030.

The HMMI plant has engine, outfitting, painting, press and car body factories, mobility innovation center, among others. It is also characterized by the application of various eco-friendly methods. Some of the plant's electricity is produced with solar power generation facilities, and volatile organic compounds were minimized by the water-soluble painting method. Furthermore, air pollution reduction facilities were used to reduce air pollution and heat loss was minimized by applying far-infrared ovens to the painting process.

Models

Current

Discontinued
Hyundai Accent/Excel
Hyundai Arya H-100
Hyundai Atoz
Hyundai Avega/Grand Avega
Hyundai Azera/Grandeur
Hyundai Coupé
Hyundai Elantra
Hyundai Getz
Hyundai H-1/Grand Starex
Hyundai H-100
Hyundai i10/Grand i10
Hyundai i20
Hyundai Ioniq Electric
Hyundai Kona/Kona Electric
Hyundai Matrix
Hyundai Sonata
Hyundai Tucson
Hyundai Trajet

See also 
 List of Hyundai Motor Company manufacturing facilities

References 

Manufacturing companies based in Jakarta
Car manufacturers of Indonesia
Indonesian companies established in 2019
Vehicle manufacturing companies established in 2019